James Coburn (1928–2002) was an American actor and director

James Coburn may also refer to:

James Coburn (criminal) (1926–1964), last person to be executed in the US for a crime other than murder
Jim Coburn (born 1944), US politician, 2006 republican nominee for Governor of New Hampshire
James Coburn (Irish politician) (1889–1953), Irish National League / Independent / Fine Gael politician from Louth

See also
James Cockburn (disambiguation) (pronounced James Coburn)